Club Baloncesto Ciudad de Valladolid, also known as Real Valladolid Baloncesto by sponsorship reasons, is a Spanish professional basketball team based in Valladolid, Castile and León. The team currently plays in league LEB Oro.

History
CB Ciudad de Valladolid was founded in June 2015 by the former American-Spanish retired player Mike Hansen with the aim to replace CB Valladolid, the main club of the city, which was dissolved at the end of the 2014–15 season.

In its first season, in LEB Plata, Ciudad de Valladolid was relegated after finishing the league with only nine wins in 26 games. However, the club remained the league due to the existence of vacant spots.

As other teams in previous seasons, Ciudad de Valladolid took advantage and promoted to LEB Oro in the next season by defeating Fundación Lucentum, Morón and Zornotza in the promotion playoffs.

In 2020, when the team was leading the LEB Oro, the season was curtailed due to the COVID-19 pandemic. However, the club was awarded with the promotion to Liga ACB but did not fulfill the requirements for joining the league.

On 28 July 2020, Ciudad de Valladolid agreed collaboration terms with local association football club Real Valladolid and started to use their name, colors and crest.

Sponsorship naming
Brico Dépôt Ciudad de Valladolid 2015–2016
Comercial Ulsa Ciudad de Valladolid 2016–2017
Carramimbre CBC Valladolid 2017–2020
Real Valladolid Baloncesto 2020–present

Players

Current roster

Depth chart

Notable players

Frank Bartley (born 1994), basketball player for Ironi Ness Ziona of the Israeli Basketball Premier League

Head coaches
Iñaki Martín 2015–2016
Paco García 2016–2019
Hugo López 2019–2021
Roberto González 2021-2022
Paco García 2022-present

Season by season

Trophies and awards

Trophies
LEB Oro: (1)
2020

Individual awards
LEB Plata MVP
Sergio de la Fuente – 2017

Notes

References

External links

Basketball teams established in 2015
Basketball teams in Castile and León
LEB Oro teams
Former LEB Plata teams
2015 establishments in Castile and León
Sport in Valladolid